My Pal Bob was a United Kingdom television sitcom originally shown in ten episodes from 1957 to 1958. Written by Bob Monkhouse and Denis Goodwin, the show starred Bob Monkhouse and narrated by Denis Goodwin. All recorded episodes were thought to have been destroyed until it was discovered that Monkhouse had kept a number episodes from shows including "My Pal Bob" in his own private archive.

Main cast
Bob Monkhouse

Episodes

References

External links

BBC television sitcoms
Lost BBC episodes
1957 British television series debuts
1958 British television series endings
1950s British comedy television series